Antje Tillmann (born 18 August 1964 in Düsseldorf) is a German politician of the Christian Democratic Union (CDU) who has been serving as a member of the Bundestag from the state of Thuringia since 2002.

Early life 
After graduating from high school in 1983, Tillmann studied Finance at the University of Applied Sciences for Finance in Nordkirchen, which she completed in 1986 with a Degree in Finance. She then worked as a tax official in North Rhine-Westphalia. In 1991, she moved to Brandenburg, where she participated in the establishment of the University of Applied Sciences for Finance in Königs Wusterhausen. In 1993, she finally went to Thuringia and worked in the Ministry of Finance there. In 1998, she passed the examination to become a tax consultant.

Tillmann is Roman Catholic, divorced, and has one daughter.

Political career 
Tillmann first became a member of the Bundestag in the 2002 German federal election. She was a member of the Budget Committee until moving to the Finance Committee in 2005. In this capacity, she served as her parliamentary group's rapporteur on the introduction of a balanced budget amendment in 2009.

In the negotiations to form Chancellor Angela Merkel’s fourth coalition government following the 2017 federal elections, Tillmann was part of the working group on financial policies and taxes, led by Peter Altmaier, Andreas Scheuer and Olaf Scholz.

Together with Roland Heintze, Daniel Günther, Andreas Jung, David McAllister, Nadine Schön and Oliver Wittke, Tillmann co-chaired the CDU's 2018 national convention in Hamburg.

Other activities 
 German Red Cross (DRK), Member
 Federal Agency for Civic Education (BPB), Alternate Member of the Board of Trustees (2005-2011)

Political positions
In June 2017, Tillmann voted against her parliamentary group's majority and in favor of Germany's introduction of same-sex marriage.

In September 2020, Tillmann was one of 15 members of her parliamentary group who joined Norbert Röttgen in writing an open letter to Minister of the Interior Horst Seehofer which called on Germany and other EU counties to take in 5000 immigrants who were left without shelter after fires gutted the overcrowded Mória Reception and Identification Centre on the Greek island of Lesbos.

References

External links 

  
 Bundestag biography 

1964 births
Living people
Members of the Bundestag for Thuringia
Female members of the Bundestag
21st-century German women politicians
Members of the Bundestag 2021–2025
Members of the Bundestag 2017–2021
Members of the Bundestag 2013–2017
Members of the Bundestag 2009–2013
Members of the Bundestag 2005–2009
Members of the Bundestag 2002–2005
Members of the Bundestag for the Christian Democratic Union of Germany
Politicians from Düsseldorf